Otto Weckerling (Magdeburg, 23 October 1910 — Dortmund, 6 May 1977) was a German professional road bicycle racer. Weckerling won two stages in the Tour de France.

Major results

1936
Frankfurt
1937
Deutschland Tour
Tour de France:
Winner stage 8
1938
Tour de France:
Winner stage 17
1950
 National Track Madison Championship (with Werner Richter)

References

External links 

Official Tour de France results for Otto Weckerling

1910 births
1977 deaths
German male cyclists
German Tour de France stage winners
Sportspeople from Magdeburg
People from the Province of Saxony
Cyclists from Saxony-Anhalt